HCLS1-associated protein X-1 is a protein that in humans is encoded by the HAX1 gene.

The protein encoded by this gene is known to associate with HS1, a substrate of Src family tyrosine kinases. It also interacts with the product of PKD2 gene, mutations in which are associated with autosomal-dominant polycystic kidney disease, and with F-actin-binding protein, cortactin. It was earlier thought that this gene product is mainly localized in the mitochondria, however, recent studies indicate it to be localized in the cell body. Two transcript variants encoding different isoforms have been found for this gene.

In 2015, localization of the protein to P-bodies was demonstrated.

Severe congenital neutropenia
Homozygous mutations in HAX1 are associated with autosomal recessive severe congenital neutropenia.

Interactions
HAX1 has been shown to interact with IL1A.  The protein has also been shown to interact with the 3' untranslated regions of vimentin and DNA polymerase B transcripts. The protein has been shown to interact with the mitochondrial protein disaggregase Skd3 and Skd3 has been shown to be essential for HAX1 solubility within mitochondria.

References

Further reading